Addis may refer to:

Places
Addis Ababa, the capital of Ethiopia
Addis Ababa University
Addis Ketema, a city district
Addis, Louisiana, a town in West Baton Rouge Parish, Louisiana, US

People
Addis (name)

Businesses
The Addis Company, a defunct New York department store which merged with Dey Brothers
Addis Housewares, a British household products company
Addis Fortune, a newspaper

See also

 Addis Ababa Agreement (disambiguation)
 
 Adis (disambiguation)
 Addi (disambiguation)